The 2001 Washington Huskies football team was an American football team that represented the University of Washington during the 2001 NCAA Division I-A football season.  In its third season under head coach Rick Neuheisel, the team compiled an 8-4 record, finished in a three-way tie for second place in the Pacific-10 Conference, and was outscored 370 to 353.

Running back Willie Hurst and linebacker Ben Mahdavi were selected as the team's most valuable players on offense and defense, respectively.

Schedule

 Due to Pac-10 scheduling, rival Oregon was not played for the only time since 1944.
 Following the September 11 attacks, the Miami game was moved from September 15 to November 24.

Roster

NFL Draft
Three Huskies were selected in the 2002 NFL Draft, which lasted seven rounds (261 selections).

References

Washington
Washington Huskies football seasons
Washington Huskies football